The Order of Chiang Chung-Cheng is a civilian order of the Republic of China. The Chinese characters for "Chung-cheng", the Chinese name of President Chiang Kai-shek, are inscribed on the main medal, while the accompanying medal has a picture of the Republic of China Constitution. The order was instituted in 1980 and has no ranks.

Recipients

External links

References

Orders, decorations, and medals of the Republic of China
Awards established in 1980